Mikhail Lyubushin (born April 7, 1984) is a Russian former professional ice hockey player. He played for Krylya Sovetov Moscow, HC Khimik Voskresensk, Severstal Cherepovets, Avangard Omsk, Torpedo Nizhny Novgorod and Metallurg Magnitogorsk. He was selected by Los Angeles Kings in the 7th round (215th overall) of the 2002 NHL Entry Draft.

Career statistics

Regular season and playoffs

International

External links

1984 births
Metallurg Magnitogorsk players
Living people
Los Angeles Kings draft picks
Russian ice hockey defencemen
Torpedo Nizhny Novgorod players
Avangard Omsk players
Severstal Cherepovets players
HC Vityaz players
HC Khimik Voskresensk players
HC Dynamo Moscow players
Krylya Sovetov Moscow players